Aeroflex Inc. was an American company which produced test equipment, RF and microwave integrated circuits, components and systems used for wireless communications. Its headquarters were located in Plainview, New York.  In May 2014, Aeroflex was acquired by the UK aerospace company Cobham for $1.46 billion.

Overview
Aeroflex consisted of Aeroflex Microelectronic Solutions (AMS), a fabless manufacturer of rad-hard and high reliability semiconductor devices, and Aeroflex Test Solutions (ATS), which produced electronic test equipment.

History
In 2002, Aeroflex acquired IFR Systems Inc, a test equipment manufacturer from Wichita, Kansas, originally founded in 1937.  In 1998, IFR previously acquired Marconi Instruments, a British test equipment manufacturer.

In 2007, Aeroflex was taken private by a group of private equity firms including Veritas Capital, Golden Gate Capital, GS Direct.

In 2008, Aeroflex acquired Gaisler Research, a designer of rad-hard IP for space applications, including the open source LEON processor.

In 2009, Aeroflex acquired VI Technology, a test automation company.

In 2010, Aeroflex acquired Willtek, a test equipment manufacturer from San Diego, California.  Willtek was split from another company which previously acquired Wavetek.

In 2010, Aeroflex acquired Radiation Assured Devices of Colorado Springs, Colorado and changes its name to Aeroflex RAD.

In 2010, Aeroflex acquired Advanced Control Components for $20 Million.>

In 2010, Aeroflex announced an initial public offering of 17.25 million shares.

In FY 2010, AMS and ATS contributed almost equally to net sales.  The majority of sales, particularly for AMS, are in the space, avionics, and defense markets.

In May 2014, Aeroflex was acquired by the UK aerospace company Cobham for $1.46 billion.

In March 2018, Viavi Solutions purchased Cobham AvComm and Wireless Test and Measurement, which were previously part of Aeroflex, for $455 million. These business units will continue using the name Aeroflex until March 2021.

Aeroflex Colorado Springs

Aeroflex Colorado Springs was a division which manufactured integrated circuits for the aerospace, defense, medical, industrial, and security markets. It was located in Colorado Springs, Colorado. Aeroflex  mixed-signal ASICs and standard products containing data acquisition, communication, and processing circuits are supplied for uses such as medical imaging, safety-critical industrial, point-of-sale, and secure data processing systems.  Circuit card assembly was also available.

Legal actions 
In 2013, the US State Department settled with Aeroflex Incorporated over alleged violations of the Arms Export Control Act  ("AECA")(22 U.S.C. § 2778) and the International Traffic in Arms Regulations ("ITAR")(22 C.F.R. parts 120-130).  The settlement was reached relative to ITAR Section 128.11 wherein Aeroflex entered into a consent agreement with the State Department.  Based on this settlement, Aeroflex paid a civil penalty of $4 million, and the State Department waived an additional $4 million penalty  on the “condition the Department approves expenditures for self-initiated, pre-Consent Agreement remedial compliance measures and Consent Agreement-authorized remedial compliance costs.” Aeroflex voluntarily disclosed most of the ITAR violations resolved in this settlement, “acknowledged their serious nature, cooperated with Department reviews, and since 2008 has implemented or has planned extensive remedial measures, including the restructuring of its compliance organization, the institution of a new testing protocol of its commodities, and a revised company-wide ITAR compliance program,” according to the State Department.  According to a Reuters special report, while the State Department’s investigation was underway, Aeroflex exported more than 7,000 high-tech rad-chips to China, between 2003 and 2008, after US officials had directed the company to stop the exports.

Products 
AMS Group
 Hi-rel MSI integrated circuits
 RF and microwave discretes
 Mixed signal and digital ASICs
 Motion control

ATS Group
 Wireless communications test (the TM500 LTE test system was Aeroflex's top-selling product in FY 2010)
 Avionics test
 Signal generators
 Spectrum/signal analyzers

ATE Group
 Incircuit test systems
 AOI
 Functional Test platform

See also

 Electronic test equipment
 Harvey R. Blau

References

External links
 
 Cobham Gaisler AB
 IFR Systems - archived on May 27, 2002

Companies formerly listed on the New York Stock Exchange
Electronic test equipment manufacturers
Companies based in Nassau County, New York
Plainview, New York
Economy of Wichita, Kansas
Economy of San Diego
Defunct manufacturing companies based in New York (state)